Christian Emmanuel Sánchez Narváez (born 4 April 1989) is a Mexican football defender who plays for Alebrijes de Oaxaca in Ascenso MX. Sánchez was a member of the 2005 FIFA U-17 World Championship squad that won the championship. Sánchez was transferred to Monarcas Morelia on December 14, 2009, but was released after the season.

Honours
Mexico U17
FIFA U-17 World Championship: 2005

References

External links
 

Atlas F.C. footballers
Chiapas F.C. footballers
Santos Laguna footballers
Atlético Morelia players
San Luis F.C. players
Tecos F.C. footballers
Footballers from Guadalajara, Jalisco
2009 CONCACAF U-20 Championship players
Mexican footballers
Living people
1989 births
Association football defenders